Beşiri District is a district of the Batman Province of Turkey. Its seat is the town Beşiri. Its area is 809 km2, and the district had a population of 30,928 in 2021.

Yazidi presence 
Beşiri once had large Yazidi population, in villages like Kurukavak (Hamdûna) and Uğrak (Texeriyê), only a couple of Yazidi families remain today. However, elsewhere, in Yolveren (Çinêra), Oğuz (Şimzê) and Üçkuyular (Faqîra), some families have returned from diaspora to settle again. These families, have constructed a social and traditional condolence house in Üçkuyular village, with support from the diaspora community in Europe. Villagers and the neighbouring villages use the building as a community place, where they do weddings, funerals and other occasions, as well as prayers. The diaspora Yezidis that funded the house usually have vacation there in the summer. The purpose of this house, which has four rooms, a kitchen and a prayer room, is to help preserve Yazidi presence, culture and traditions in the area.

Composition
There are two municipalities in Beşiri District:
 Beşiri
 İkiköprü

There are 53 villages in Beşiri District:

 Alaca
 Asmadere
 Atbağı
 Ayrancı
 Bahçeli
 Başarı
 Beşpınar
 Beyçayırı
 Bilek
 Çakıllı
 Çavuşbayırı
 Çığırlı
 Dağyolu
 Danalı
 Dayılar
 Değirmenüstü
 Deveboynu
 Doğankavak
 Doğanpazarı
 Durucak
 Esence
 Eskihamur
 Güvercinlik
 İkiyaka
 Ilıca
 İnpınar
 Işıkveren
 Karatepe
 Kaşüstü
 Kayatepe
 Kumçay
 Kumgeçit
 Kurukavak
 Kuşçukuru
 Kütüklü
 Oğuz
 Örmegöze
 Otluca
 Samanlı
 Tekağaç
 Tepecik
 Uğurca
 Üçkuyular
 Yakacık
 Yalınca
 Yalınkavak
 Yarımtaş
 Yazıhan
 Yenipınar
 Yeniyol
 Yeşiloba
 Yolkonak
 Yontukyazı

The district encompasses fifty hamlets.

References 

Districts of Batman Province